Khachig Oskanian was a journalist and writer of The New York Herald newspaper and was one of the first Armenian settlers in the United States.

Life
Khachig Oskanian arrived in America from Constantinople in 1834 to seek higher education and went on to graduate from the City College of New York. Author Dennis Papazian believes that he was most probably sent to the United States by Christian missionaries.

Oskanian eventually became a feature writer for The New York Herald. In his columns and articles, he urged Armenians to emigrate from the Ottoman Empire and move to the United States. His home became an important gathering place for many of the Armenian immigrants.

Khachig Oskanian became the president of the New York Press Club and served as the Turkish Consul in New York. He always expressed his desire to establish a strong Armenian colony in America and name it "New Ani".

References

American people of Armenian descent
Armenian-American culture
Armenian journalists
Armenians from the Ottoman Empire
Year of birth missing
Year of death missing
Armenian male writers